Burkhalter is a surname. Notable people with the surname include:

Christine Burkhalter (born 1977), Swiss sport shooter
Didier Burkhalter (born 1960), Swiss politician from Neuchâtel; member of the Swiss National Council 2003–07, member of the Swiss Federal Council 2009-
Dominik Burkhalter (born 1975), Swiss jazz band leader, composer, and drummer
Edward A. Burkhalter (1928–2020), American retired naval officer; Chief of Naval Intelligence and other high staff posts
Everett G. Burkhalter (1897–1975), American politician from California; 1963–65
Joscha Burkhalter (born 1996), Swiss biathlete
Larry E. Burkhalter (born 1950), American politician
René Burkhalter (contemporary), Swiss fencing commissioner; recipient of the Olympic Order by the IOC

Fictional characters:
General Burkhalter from Hogan's Heroes

See also
Burkhalter, California, former settlement in California, United States

Swiss-language surnames